The Call of Duty Championship 2014 was a Call of Duty: Ghosts tournament that occurred on March 28–30, 2014. It was the second annual iteration of the event.

Qualifying took place through online tournaments and live regional finals that ran from late February and early March in Australia, the U.K. and the U.S.

compLexity Gaming won the tournament with a roster of Patrick "ACHES" Price, TeePee, Crimsix, Damon "Karma" Barlow after beating Team EnVyUs, MerK, Rambo, NameLeSs, StuDyy, 3–0 in the finals. Those two teams and also third place OpTic Gaming received invitations to the Call of Duty tournament at the X Games Austin 2015.

The tournament was livestreamed online on MLG.tv.

Placings

Top 8

References

External links
 Official webpage

Call of Duty Championship, 2014
Call of Duty Championship, 2014
Call of Duty Championship, 2014
Call of Duty
Call of Duty Championship